Tadas is a Lithuanian masculine given name. It is a cognate of the name Thaddeus and may refer to:
Tadas Blinda (1846–1877), Lithuanian folk hero of the 19th century
Tadas Gražiūnas (born 1978), Lithuanian footballer
Tadas Ivanauskas (1882–1970), Lithuanian zoologist, biologist and a founder of Vytautas Magnus University
Tadas Kijanskas (born 1985), Lithuanian footballer 
Tadas Klimavičius (born 1982), Lithuanian basketball player
Tadas Kumeliauskas (born 1990), Lithuanian ice hockey player
Tadas Labukas (born 1984), Lithuanian footballer
Tadas Langaitis (born 1977), Lithuanian civic activist and entrepreneur
Tadas Murnikas (born ????), Lithuanian cyclist and Olympic competitor
Tadas Papečkys (born 1978), Lithuanian footballer
Tadas Šuškevičius (born 1985), Lithuanian race-walker and Olympic competitor

As a middle name:
Linas Tadas Karosas (born 1964), Lithuanian businessman and entrepreneur

Lithuanian masculine given names